Marius Radu (born 18 June 1992) is a Romanian swimmer. He competed in the men's 4 × 100 metre freestyle relay event at the 2016 Summer Olympics.

References

External links
 

1992 births
Living people
Romanian male freestyle swimmers
Olympic swimmers of Romania
Swimmers at the 2016 Summer Olympics
Swimmers at the 2010 Summer Youth Olympics
Sportspeople from Bucharest